Hookerton is a town in Greene County, North Carolina, United States. The population was 409 at the 2010 census. It is geographically located southeast of Snow Hill on North Carolina Highway 123. The town is part of the Greenville Metropolitan Area.

Geography
Hookerton is located at  (35.423060, -77.590101).

Demographics

As of the census of 2000, 467 people, 200 households, and 123 families residing in the town. The population density was 1,446.1 people per square mile (563.5/km2). There were 219 housing units at an average density of 678.1 per square mile (264.2/km2). The racial makeup of the town was 52.89% White, 40.26% African American, 6.64% from other races, and 0.21% from two or more races. Hispanic or Latino of any race were 8.14% of the population.

There were 200 households, out of which 27.0% had children under the age of 18 living with them, 42.0% were married couples living together, 14.5% had a female householder with no husband present, and 38.5% were non-families. 37.0% of all households were made up of individuals, and 18.0% had someone living alone who was 65 years of age or older. The average household size was 2.34 and the average family size was 3.07.

In the town, the population was spread out, with 24.0% under the age of 18, 9.6% from 18 to 24, 23.1% from 25 to 44, 26.3% from 45 to 64, and 16.9% who were 65 years of age or older. The median age was 40 years. For every 100 females, there were 78.2 males. For every 100 females age 18 and over, there were 78.4 males.

The median income for a household in the town was $31,563, and the median income for a family was $45,625. Males had a median income of $29,231 versus $26,667 for females. The per capita income for the town was $14,371. About 7.4% of families and 16.7% of the population were below the poverty line, including 22.8% of those under age 18 and 24.6% of those age 65 or over.

Education
The town is served by the Greene County Public School system, with five schools located in nearby Snow Hill. In addition to these schools, there is one private school, Mt. Calvary Christian Academy.  Early in the 20th century, Hookerton Collegiate Institute was located in the center of town and R.J. Matlock was the principal of the school.  It did not survive the availability of public education.  (His daughter, Sara Stocks of Hookerton, served on and as chair of the Greene County School Board for a number of years in mid-century, continuing the family's interest in local education.)

Transportation
The closest airport to Hookerton is Pitt-Greenville Airport  with service to Charlotte Douglas International Airport.

The only highway that runs through Hookerton is NC 123.

East Carolina Railroad, intended to serve a route from Tarboro to Kinston, terminated in Hookerton instead, coming from Tarboro but ending just over the Contentnea Creek bridge and never reaching Kinston.  The railroad provided passenger and freight service during the early 20th century, but has long since ceased operation.

Notable people
Jim Ray Hart, baseball player.
Douglas A. Shackelford, American accounting academic, Dean, Kenan-Flagler Business School.
Franc White, Southern Sportsman, conservationists

References

External links
 Town of Hookerton Official Website
 Non Profit Economic Development Group Serving Greene County, NC

Towns in Greene County, North Carolina
Towns in North Carolina
Greenville, North Carolina metropolitan area